Juan Felipe Ortiz (born August 13, 1964) is a retired male long jumper who represented Cuba during his career. His main rival during the 1980s and early 1990s was Jaime Jefferson.

Achievements

References
1983 Year Rankings

1964 births
Living people
Cuban male long jumpers
Pan American Games medalists in athletics (track and field)
Pan American Games bronze medalists for Cuba
Central American and Caribbean Games gold medalists for Cuba
Athletes (track and field) at the 1983 Pan American Games
Competitors at the 1990 Central American and Caribbean Games
Central American and Caribbean Games medalists in athletics
Medalists at the 1983 Pan American Games